Téra is a city in the Tillabéri Region, Tera Department of Niger.  It is situated 175 km north-west of the capital Niamey, close to the border with Burkina Faso.  It is mainly inhabited by Songhai, Fulani, Gourmantche and Buzu ethnic groups.  The majority of the population are farmers.

Commerce 

Every Thursday marks the market day at Tera.  Animals, mainly cattle, goats, sheep and domestic birds are traded by farmers from all corners of the Department.

Notable people 

 Fatou Djibo - educator, feminist and trade unionist

References 

Tillabéri Region
Communes of Tillabéri Region